Franco Fabbri (born 1949) is a Brazilian-born Italian musician, musicologist and broadcaster.

Born in São Paulo in 1949, from 1965 Fabbri was guitarist, vocalist and composer for Stormy Six, regarded as one of the most interesting Italian progressive bands, and one much admired by the specialist press: in 1980 the group received an award for best rock album of the year from the West German record critics, coming ahead of Police. In addition to making eight albums with Stormy Six, he recorded a number of works of electronic and experimental music.

As musicologist, Fabbri has published on the rapport between music and technology (Elettronica e musica); on music as a 360° phenomenon (Il suono in cui viviamo, recently reprinted in an expanded version by Arcana Editore); on the analysis of popular song (in Fabrizio De André. Accordi eretici and Mina. Una forza incantatrice and in the Einaudi Encyclopedia of music); and on musical genres, published in various books and international journals.

Fabbri has served as chairman of the International Association for the Study of Popular Music (IASPM) and has been involved in the editing of the periodical "Musica/Realtà" and the "Le sfere" series of studies in music. Fabbri currently teaches at University of Turin as well as History of Popular Music at Parma Music Conservatory, and has also taught a course on the economics of the many aspects of music production  as part of the Scienze e Tecnologie della Comunicazione Musicale (STCM) degree at the University of Milan. As a broadcaster he became well known as one of the presenters of the RAI Radio3 series Radio Tre Suite. In 2017 he became Visiting Professor at the University of Huddersfield.

Bibliography
 Elettronica e musica, Fratelli Fabbri, 1984
 Il suono in cui viviamo, Feltrinelli, 1996
 Fabrizio De André. Accordi eretici, Euresis, 1997
 Mina. Una forza incantatrice, Euresis, 1998
 Il suono in cui viviamo, Arcana Editore, 2002 (2nd edition)
 L'ascolto tabù, Milano, il Saggiatore, 2005
 Il Suono in cui viviamo, il Saggiatore, 2008 (3rd Edition)
 Around the Clock, UTET, 2008

See also
Romantic Warriors II: A Progressive Music Saga About Rock in Opposition
Romantic Warriors II: Special Features DVD

References

External links
 Official site
 Browsing Music Spaces - Categories and The Musical Mind.
 A Theory of Musical Genres - Two Applications (1980).

1949 births
Living people
Italian rock singers
Italian musicologists
Italian radio presenters
Italian rock guitarists
Italian male guitarists
Brazilian emigrants to Italy
Musicians from São Paulo